Life & Death is the debut studio album by Thud, released in 1992 by Fifth Colvmn Records. In April 2015 the lead track "Ventilator" was played on Diane's Kamikaze Fun Machine: Playlist on WMUC-FM.

Reception

AllMusic gave Life & Death gave three out of five possible stars. Fabryka Music Magazine awarded the album a flawless rating of four out of four stars, describing it as "heaviest Fifth Colvmn album" and "a violent assault of great rock and heavy metal."

Track listing

Personnel 
Adapted from the Life & Death liner notes.

Thud
 Robert Dotolo – lead vocals, guitars, production, mixing
 Gregg Hudson – drums, backing vocals
 Chris Rasley – bass guitar, guitar (1)
 Adam Rutland – guitar, backing vocals

Additional performers
 Eli Janney – engineering, piano (3)
 Barrett Jones – production, mixing, backing vocals (7)
 Jared Louche – production, mixing, additional guitar (1)

Production and design
 Craig Albertson (at CyberGrafiks) – photography
 Zalman Fishman – executive-producer
 Dave Harris – mastering
 Phil Merkle – cover art
 Nikolas H. Huffman – design

Release history

References

External links 
 Life & Death at Discogs (list of releases)
 Life & Death at iTunes

1992 debut albums
Thud (band) albums
Fifth Colvmn Records albums